Argenta is a surname. Notable people with the surname include:

Ataúlfo Argenta (1913–1958), Spanish conductor and pianist
Nancy Argenta (born 1957), Canadian opera singer